Michael Yerxa is a Canadian documentary filmmaker. He is most noted for his collaborations with Mark Kenneth Woods, including the films Take Up the Torch (2015) and Two Soft Things, Two Hard Things (2016), and the television series Pride.

Originally from Hampton, New Brunswick, he attended Kennebecasis Valley High School. Active in the theatre program, he won a student theatre award from Theatre New Brunswick in 2000 for his play Small Actors. He then studied theatre at Queen's University, appearing in theatre productions including The Music Man and City of Angels, before moving to Toronto, where he became known as one of the regular panelists on 1 Girl 5 Gays.

In addition to his filmmaking, Yerxa has also worked in casting, including credits on the film Porcupine Lake and the television series The Amazing Race Canada, Splatalot! and The Adventures of Napkin Man. He received a Canadian Screen Award nomination for Best Casting in a Television Series at the 8th Canadian Screen Awards in 2020 for his work on The Amazing Race Canada, the first time in the history of the awards that a reality show was nominated in that category.

He was a story producer on the 2020 series Canada's Drag Race.

References

External links

21st-century Canadian male actors
21st-century Canadian dramatists and playwrights
Canadian documentary film directors
Canadian male dramatists and playwrights
Canadian male musical theatre actors
Canadian casting directors
Film directors from New Brunswick
Canadian LGBT dramatists and playwrights
LGBT film directors
Canadian gay actors
Canadian gay writers
Male actors from New Brunswick
Writers from New Brunswick
People from Hampton, New Brunswick
Queen's University at Kingston alumni
Living people
Year of birth missing (living people)
Gay dramatists and playwrights
21st-century Canadian LGBT people